Aedes camptorhynchus, the southern saltmarsh mosquito, is responsible for transmitting the Ross River virus, which causes Ross River fever.

The mosquito had become established in New Zealand, after it was accidentally transported from Australia to Hawke’s Bay, in 1998 from where it dispersed to another 10 localities mainly on the North Island. It was declared to be eradicated in 2010.

See also
List of Aedes species

References

External links
Aedes camptorhynchus at the Encyclopedia of Life
Aedes camptorhynchus at the Department of Medical Entomology, University of Sydney
Southern saltmarsh mosquito at Biosecurity New Zealand

camptorhynchus
Insects described in 1868